John Qualen (born Johan Mandt Kvalen, December 8, 1899 – September 12, 1987) was an American character actor of Norwegian heritage who specialized in Scandinavian roles.

Early years 
Qualen was born in Vancouver, British Columbia, the son of immigrants from Norway; his father was a Lutheran minister and changed the family's original surname, "Kvalen", to "Qualen" – though some sources give Oleson, later Oleson Kvalen as Qualen's earlier surnames. His father's ministering meant many moves and John was 20 when he graduated from Elgin (Illinois) High School in 1920. For four years, Qualen attended the University of Toronto, but he left there to join a Toronto-based traveling troupe as an actor.

Career 
In a Milwaukee Journal interview he said he needed to start working and did so with the Chautauqua Circuit. He drove stakes for the tent used for presentations until a night in Ripon, Wisconsin, when the scheduled principal lecturer did not arrive. Qualen replaced the missing man after he showed the Chautauqua manager a medal he had won for oratory as a high school student. Not long after that, he formed his own troupe, The Qualen Concert Company. At the conclusion of a tour following his marriage, Qualen and his wife, Pearle, formed the company to produce plays. The group's stops in a two-year tour included Boston, Chicago, and New Orleans. The Qualens' income was low enough that he sold cookware in New York for additional funds. Using a handcart to move the merchandise, he made more money from sales than from his acting.

Eventually reaching Broadway, he gained his big break there in 1929, when he was cast as the Swedish janitor Carl Olsen in Elmer Rice's play Street Scene. His movie career began when he re-created the role two years later in the film adaptation of the stage production. That screen performance was followed by his appearance in John Ford's Arrowsmith (1931), which began a more than 35-year membership in the director's "stock company", with supporting roles in The Searchers (1956), Two Rode Together (1961), The Man Who Shot Liberty Valance (1962) and Cheyenne Autumn (1964).

 

Appearing in well over one hundred films, and acting on television into the 1970s, Qualen performed many of his roles with various accents, usually Scandinavian, often intended for comic effect. Three of his more memorable roles showcase his versatility. Qualen assumed a Midwestern dialect as Muley, who recounts the destruction of his farm by the bank in Ford's The Grapes of Wrath (1940), in a performance so powerful it reportedly reduced director Ford to tears; and as the confused killer Earl Williams in Howard Hawks' classic comedy His Girl Friday (1940). As Berger, the jewelry-selling Norwegian resistance member in Michael Curtiz' Casablanca (1942), he used a light Scandinavian accent, but put on a thicker Mediterranean accent as the homeward-bound fisherman Locota in William Wellman's The High and the Mighty (1954)

Qualen was also a flautist, having begun to play at age eight. He continued his musical education while at the University of Toronto and went on to play with some professional orchestras, including the Hollywood Bowl Orchestra.

Qualen was treasurer of The Authors Club and historian of The Masquers, Hollywood's social group for actors.

Personal life and death
In 1924, after he became an actor, Qualen married Pearle Larson, whom he had known in high school. She joined him in the Toronto-based traveling troupe when he left university, becoming the troupe's costume mistress. The couple remained together for over 60 years, until 1987, when Qualen died at age 87 of heart failure in Torrance, California.

Filmography

1930s

Street Scene (1931) as Karl Olsen
Arrowsmith (1931) as Henry Novak (uncredited)
The Devil's Brother (1933) as Man who owned bull (unconfirmed)
Counsellor at Law (1933) as Johan Breitstein
Let's Fall in Love (1933) as Svente Bjorkman (uncredited)
Hi Nellie! (1934) as Steve (uncredited)
No Greater Glory (1934) as Nemecsek's father
Upper World (1934) as Chris
Sing and Like It (1934) as Oswald
Private Scandal (1934) as Schultz (uncredited)
He Was Her Man (1934) as Dutch
Our Daily Bread (1934) as Chris
Straight Is the Way (1934) as Mr. Chapman (uncredited)
Servants' Entrance (1934) as Detective
365 Nights in Hollywood (1934) as Professor Herman Ellenbogen
Charlie Chan in Paris (1935) as Consierge
One More Spring (1935) as Auctioneer
The Great Hotel Murder (1935) as Ole
Black Fury (1935) as Mike
Chasing Yesterday (1935) as Aristide Coccoz
Silk Hat Kid (1935) as Mr. Fossbender
Doubting Thomas as Von Blitzer
The Farmer Takes a Wife (1935) as Sol Tinker
Orchids to You (1935) as Smith
Thunder in the Night (1935) as Hotel porter
The Three Musketeers (1935) as Planchet
Whipsaw (1935) as Will Dabson
Man of Iron (1935) as Collins
Ring Around the Moon (1936) as Bill Harvey
Wife vs. Secretary (1936) as Mr. Jenkins (uncredited)
The Country Doctor (1936) as Asa Wyatt
The Road to Glory (1936) as Scared soldier
Meet Nero Wolfe (1936) as Olaf
Girls' Dormitory (1936) as Toni
Reunion (1936) as Asa Wyatt
Seventh Heaven (1937) as Sewer Rat
Angel's Holiday (1937) as Waldo Everett
Fifty Roads to Town (1937) as Sheriff Dow
She Had to Eat (1937) as Sleepy
Fit for a King (1937) as Otto
Nothing Sacred (1937) as Fireman (uncredited)
The Bad Man of Brimstone (1937) as "Loco"
Joy of Living  (1938) as Oswego
The Texans (1938) as Abilene Swede (uncredited)
The Chaser (1938) as Lars
The Mad Miss Manton (1938) as Subway worker
Five of a Kind (1938) as Asa Wyatt
The Strange Case of Dr. Meade (1938) as Stoner
Stand Up and Fight (1939) as Davy
Let Us Live (1939) as Dan (uncredited)
Mickey the Kid (1939) as Mailman
Career (1939) as Jeff Trotter (uncredited)
Honeymoon in Bali (1939) as Meek man
Thunder Afloat (1939) as Milo
Four Wives (1939) as Frank

1940s
His Girl Friday (1940) as Earl Williams
The Grapes of Wrath (1940) as Muley Graves
Blondie on a Budget (1940) as Mr. Ed Fuddle
Saturday's Children (1940) as First carpenter (uncredited)
Ski Patrol (1940) as Gustaf
On Their Own (1940) as Peters
Babies for Sale (1940) as Howard Anderson
Angels Over Broadway (1940) as Charles Engle
Knute Rockne, All American (1940) Lars Knuteson Rockne
The Long Voyage Home (1940) as Axel
Youth Will Be Served (1940) as Clem Howie
Model Wife (1941) as Janitor
Million Dollar Baby (1941) as Dr. Patterson
Out of the Fog (1941) as Olaf Johnson
The Shepherd of the Hills (1941) as Coot Royal
The Great Awakening (1941) as Hasslinger's Clerk
The Devil and Daniel Webster (1941) as Miser Stevens
Jungle Book (1942) as The Barber
Larceny, Inc. (1942) as Sam Bachrach
Tortilla Flat (1942) as Jose Maria Corcoran
Casablanca (1942) as Berger
Arabian Nights (1942) as Alladin
Swing Shift Maisie (1943) as Horatio Curly
The Impostor (1944) as Monge
An American Romance (1944) as Anton Dubechek
Dark Waters (1944) as Uncle Norbert
Roughly Speaking (1945) as Svend Olsen
River Gang (1945) as Uncle Bill
Captain Kidd (1945) as Bart Blivens
Adventure (1945) as Model T
Song of Scheherazade (1947) as Lorenzo
High Conquest (1947) as Peter Oberwalder Sr.
The Fugitive (1947) as Refugee doctor
Reaching from Heaven (1948) as The Stranger
On Our Merry Way (1948) (deleted sequence, uncredited)
Alias a Gentleman (1948) as No End
My Girl Tisa (1948) as Svenson
16 Fathoms Deep (1948) as Capt. Athos
Hollow Triumph (1948) as Swangon
The Big Steal (1949) as Julius Seton

1950s
Captain China (1950) as Geech
Buccaneer's Girl (1950) as Vegetable man
Woman on the Run (1950) as Maibus
The Jackpot (1950) as Mr. Ferguson (uncredited)
The Flying Missile (1950) as Lars Hansen
Belle Le Grand (1951) as Corky McGee
Goodbye, My Fancy (1951) as Professor Dingley
Hans Christian Andersen (1952) as Burgomaster
Ambush at Tomahawk Gap (1953) as Jonas P. Travis
Francis Covers the Big Town (1953) as Defense Attorney Cavendish (uncredited)
I, the Jury (1953) as Dr. R. H. Vickers
The High and the Mighty (1954) as Jose Locota
The Student Prince (1954) as Willie Klauber
Passion (1954) as Gasper Melo
The Other Woman (1954) as Papasha
Unchained (1955) as Leonard Haskins
The Sea Chase (1955) as Chief Engineer Schmitt
At Gunpoint (1955) as Livingstone
The Searchers (1956) as Lars Jorgensen
Johnny Concho (1956) as Jake
The Big Land (1957) as Sven Johnson
My World Dies Screaming (1958) as Jonah Snell
The Gun Runners (1958) as Pop
Revolt in the Big House (1958) as Doc
Anatomy of a Murder (1959) as Deputy Sheriff Sulo

1960s
Hell Bent for Leather (1960) as Old Ben
Elmer Gantry (1960) as Sam, a storekeeper (uncredited)
North to Alaska (1960) as Logger Judge
Two Rode Together (1961) as Ole Knudsen
The Man Who Shot Liberty Valance (1962) as Peter Erickson
Donovan's Reef (1963) as Deckhand (uncredited)
The Prize (1963) as Oscar
7 Faces of Dr. Lao (1964) as Luther Lindquist
Cheyenne Autumn (1964) as Svenson (uncredited)
Those Calloways (1965) as Ernie Evans
I'll Take Sweden (1965) as Olaf
The Sons of Katie Elder (1965) as Charlie Biller
A Patch of Blue (1965) as Mr. Faber
A Big Hand for the Little Lady (1966) as Jesse Buford
The Adventures of Bullwhip Griffin (1967) as Barber (uncredited)
Firecreek (1968) as Hall
P.J. (1968) as Poppa Gonowski
Doc (1969, TV Movie) as Luke
Hail, Hero! (1969) as Billy Hurd

1970s
Getting Away from It All (1972, TV Movie) as Charlie Erickson
Wednesday Night Out (1972, TV Movie)
Frasier, the Sensuous Lion (1973) as Old man on porch

Television
Alfred Hitchcock Presents, episode  "A Bullet for Baldwin"  – Benjamin Steep (1956)
Alfred Hitchcock Presents, episode  "Help Wanted"  – Mr. Crabtree (1956)
Alfred Hitchcock Presents, episode  "Shopping for Death"  – Elmer Shore (1956)
Father Knows Best, episode "The Bus to Nowhere" - Old Man (1956)
Cheyenne, episode "Deadline" – Charley Dolan (1957)
Maverick, episode "The Lonesome Reunion" – Leland Mills (1958)
The Californians episode "J. Jimmerson Jones, Inc."—J. Jimmerson Jones (1958)
Sea Hunt (1960) Season 3, Episode 31
Mister Ed, episode "Ed's New Shoes" – Axel (the Handyman) (1961)
Bonanza, episode "Springtime" – Parley (1961)
Maverick, episode "The Golden Fleecing" – Henry Albright (1961)
The Andy Griffith Show, episode "The Jinx" – Henry Bennett (1962)
Laramie, episode "Shadow of the Past" – Mr. Elbee (1962)
The Real McCoys, episode "Cupid Wore a Tail" – Frank (1963)
The Real McCoys, episode "The Other Side of the Fence" – Frank (1963)
Make Room for Daddy, episodes  "Sense of Humor" and "Call Off the Hounds" – Swenson, the Janitor (1964)
The Virginian, episode "A Bride for Lars" – Gosta Swenson (1964)
The Girl from U.N.C.L.E., episode "The Jewels of Topango Affair" – Dr. Elmer Spritzer (1966) 
Hazel, episode "A Question of Ethics" – Mr. Johansson (1966)
Shane, episode "The Hant" - Old Man (1966)
I Spy, episode "Red Sash of Courage" – Hannos (1967)
Green Acres, episode "Eb's Romance" - Mr. Appleby (1968)
Green Acres, episode "The Ex-Con" - Willy Dunhill (1970)
The Odd Couple, episode “The Taste Of Money” - Sam (1971)
Make Room for Granddaddy, episode "The Arm Wrestle" Folsom (1971)
The Partridge Family episode "My Heart Belongs to a Two Car Garage" – The Old Man (1972)
The F.B.I., episode "The Detonator" (1973) 
Movin' On, episode "Life Line" – Liggett (1974) (final appearance)

References

Further reading

External links

 
 
 
 
 
 
Photos of John Qualen from The Long Voyage Home by Ned Scott

1899 births
1987 deaths
20th-century American male actors
American male film actors
American male television actors
American people of Norwegian descent
Burials at Forest Lawn Memorial Park (Glendale)
Canadian emigrants to the United States
Canadian people of Norwegian descent
Male actors from Vancouver
Male Western (genre) film actors
Northwestern University alumni
People from Elgin, Illinois